Mohammed Monwar Hossain (born 30 August 1979) is a retired Bangladeshi professional association footballer who played as a midfielder. He also represented the Bangladesh national football team, and won two trophies for his nation.

Club career
Monwar last played club football for Sheikh Russell Dhaka in the Bangladesh Premier League, in 2009. He played for the Mohammedan Jhenaidah & Brothers Union, earlier on in his career. Monwar also had a stint with Indian club Mahindra United, where he won the prestigious Durand Cup trophy, defeating East Bengal Club in the finals.

International career
Monwar was a regular player of the Bangladesh national football team from 1998 to 2006. He made it to the regular eleven of the national football team without playing any age-based international match, while still only being 19. He later served as the captain of U-16, U-19 and also the U-23 team during the 2004 South Asian Games, in Pakistan.

In senior level, Monwar won the Football at the 1999 South Asian Games and the 2003 SAFF Championship. He was a member of the runner-up Bangladesh team in the 1999 SAFF Championship. On 30 March 2003, Manowar scored his first and only senior international goal, during a 2-2 draw with Hong Kong, at the 2004 AFC Asian Cup qualifiers. Monwar last played for Bangladesh during a 6-1 defeat to Tajikistan, on 11 April 2006.

Coaching career
Monwar completed the AFC 'C' License Certificate Course, in 2012, and served as Head Coach in football at Pledge Harbor International School and Sports Academy. In 2015, he took charge of Arambagh Sports Association. It was under him that the Arambagh club finished runners-up in the 2015–16 Bangladesh Championship League, and earned promotion to the Bangladesh Premier League. He received 'Best Coach' from Arambagh Club and 'Best Young Promising Coach of the Year' award from Bangladesh Football Federation. Monwar has been working as a coach in Special Olympics Bangladesh since August 2014. Besides, since January 2014, he has been working as a brand ambassador for the charity for Autism and Disabled children under the National Center for Special Education.

International goals

Bangladesh national team
Scores and results list Bangladesh's goal tally first.

Honours

Club 
Mahindra United FC
Durand Cup : 1998

Mohammedan SC
Dhaka League : 1999, 2002
Federation Cup : 2008
National Football Championship : 2001–02

Brothers Union
Premier Division League : 2005
Federation Cup : 2005

International 
Bangladesh
 SAFF Championship: 2003
 South Asian Games Gold medal: 1999

References

External links

1979 births
Living people
Bangladeshi footballers
Bangladesh international footballers
Bangladeshi expatriate footballers
Bangladeshi expatriate sportspeople in India
Association football midfielders
Mohammedan SC (Dhaka) players
Brothers Union players
Sheikh Russel KC players
Bangladesh Football Premier League players
Expatriate footballers in India
Footballers at the 2002 Asian Games
Footballers from Dhaka
Bangladesh youth international footballers
Asian Games competitors for Bangladesh
Mahindra United FC players
South Asian Games gold medalists for Bangladesh
South Asian Games medalists in football